Edwin Villanes Deramas (September 15, 1966 – February 29, 2016), more commonly known as Direk Wenn or Wenn V. Deramas, was a Filipino film and TV director and screenwriter.

Education
Deramas was a graduate of University of Santo Tomas with a degree in Hotel and Restaurant Management. While studying at UST, he was involved in acting and was a member of Teatro Tomasino.

Career
Deramas worked as a waiter at the Aristocrat Restaurant and was promoted as food and beverages coordinator after two years. In 1990, he worked as a production assistant for the TV show Tatak Pilipino. He also worked as a writer for the show Teysi ng Tahanan and was promoted as the executive producer of Calvento Files. Since then, Deramas had been directing different soap operas such as Mula sa Puso (original and remake) and films including the Ang Tanging Ina series and several blockbuster movies of comedian Vice Ganda.

As TV director

As film director

Scriptwriter
Mula sa Puso (1997 TV series) (story and screenplay)
Mula sa Puso: The Movie (1999) (story and screenplay)
Ang Cute ng Ina Mo (2007) (screenplay)
The Amazing Praybeyt Benjamin (2014) (screenplay)
 Petrang Kabayo (2010) (screenplay)
This Time (2016) (screenplay)

Awards

Death
Deramas died at 6:10 AM on February 29, 2016. In 2015, Deramas underwent angioplasty after suffering heart attack 2 years prior. The immediate cause of death listed on his death certificate was cardiac arrest with respiratory failure and heart attack as underlying causes. It also indicated that he suffered from aspiration pneumonia. His body was cremated and his ashes were given to his brother. The remains of Deramas were buried in the Himlayang Pilipino in Quezon City on March 6, 2016, a day after the necrological services hosted by ABS-CBN, at the Dolphy Theatre in the ABS-CBN Broadcasting Center, also in Quezon City.

References

External links
 
 "Wenn Deramas: From waiter to topnotch director!". Mb. June 20, 2004. Accessed on July 19, 2007.

1966 births
2016 deaths
Filipino film directors
Filipino television directors
Filipino screenwriters
Filipino LGBT writers
University of Santo Tomas alumni
ABS-CBN people